Coras is a genus of funnel weavers first described by Eugène Simon in 1898. It has fifteen described species that occur in eastern North America from Nova Scotia south to Florida. They can be readily distinguished from other genera in the subfamily by their anterior median eyes being larger than the anterior lateral eyes, whereas in other genera the reverse is true, along with a number of more technical reproductive features. The type species is Coras medicinalis (so named because its web was used in medicine).

These spiders are frequently found at or near ground level, or in cellars of houses, where they construct small and rather messy sheet webs on the ground and attached to nearby more elevated things. These webs are small in area and are connected to tubular retreats with simple signal or catching threads radiating from entrance.

The middle eyes in the lower or front row are as large as or larger than the eyes that flank them on the outside. The epigynum has projections at its forward corners. The legs have indistinct gray rings.

Species
 it contains sixteen species:
Coras aerialis Muma, 1946 – USA
Coras alabama Muma, 1946 – USA
Coras angularis Muma, 1944 – USA
Coras cavernorum Barrows, 1940 – USA
Coras crescentis Muma, 1944 – USA
Coras furcatus Muma, 1946 – USA
Coras juvenilis (Keyserling, 1881) – USA
Coras kisatchie Muma, 1946 – USA
Coras lamellosus (Keyserling, 1887) – USA, Canada
Coras medicinalis (Hentz, 1821) – USA, Canada
Coras montanus (Emerton, 1890) – USA, Canada
Coras parallelis Muma, 1944 – USA
Coras perplexus Muma, 1946 – USA
Coras seorakensis Seo, 2014 – Korea
Coras taugynus Chamberlin, 1925 – USA
Coras tennesseensis Muma, 1946 – USA

References

Agelenidae
Araneomorphae genera